Multidrug resistance pumps (MDR pumps) also known Multidrug efflux pumps are a type of efflux pump and P-glycoprotein. MDR pumps in the cell membrane extrudes many foreign substances out of the cells and some pumps can have a broad specificity.  MDR pumps exist in animals, fungi, and bacteria and likely evolved as a defense mechanism against harmful substances. There are seven families of MDRs and are grouped by homology, energy source, and overall structure.

There are five major classes of efflux pumps in bacteria: the ATP-binding cassette (ABC) superfamily, the resistance nodulation division (RND) superfamily, the major facilitator superfamily (MFS), the small multidrug resistance (SMR) superfamily, and the multidrug and toxic compound extrusion (MATE) family. There are also two minor classes: the proteobacterial antimicrobial compound efflux (PACE) family, and the p-aminobenzoyl-glutamate transporter (AbgT) family. The ABC superfamily uses ATP as an energy source for export while the rest of the efflux pumps use proton motive force. Between them, the efflux pump classes cover a wide range of substrate specificities and are involved in numerous cellular processes including cell-to-cell communication, biofilm formation, virulence, and impart cellular protection through extrusion of toxic metabolic byproducts, toxic compounds, and clinical antibiotics.

Extrusion of compounds by efflux pumps is energy dependent. ABC transporters use ATP hydrolysis for efflux. The rest of the characterized pumps use proton motive force. The increased use in antibiotics has resulted in a concomitant increase in antibiotic resistant bacteria. Pathogenic bacterial and fungal species have developed MDR pumps which efflux out many antibiotics and antifugals, increasing the concentration needed for their effect. In bacteria, overexpression of some efflux pumps can result in decreased susceptibility to multiple antibiotics.

Because of their importance in drug evasion such as in antibiotic resistance, there is a growing about of research on Efflux pump inhibitors (EPIs). Many promising EPIs come from plant secondary metabolites and small molecule compounds.

References

Protein families
Drug resistance